Mehal Singh Bhullar is a retired Indian Police Service officer who has served as the director general of the Punjab Police from 2002-2003. He is accredited to lead the anti-insurgency operations in Punjab during the 1980-1990 period and is noted for facilitating unconditional surrender of several militants as Inspector General of Police, Border Range (Punjab). DGP Bhullar has also served in the Indian Army through an emergency (war) service commission with the 13th Punjab Regiment ranking as a Major and has participated in the Sino-Indian War, the Indo-Pakistan war of 1965, and serving in Mizoram counter insurgency operations in the 1960s. His usage of military knowledge in the Punjab anti-insurgency operations gained him valuable recognition. He spent many years of his service with the Punjab Armed Police where he promoted a sports culture. He played a seminal role in the establishment of the P.A.P. complex in Jalandhar along with the Police D.A.V. School of Jalandhar. Bhullar is accredited with facilitating many sportspersons in the Punjab Police including the WWE wrestler Daleep Singh popularly known as Khali. The Punjab Armed Police Indoor stadium in Jalandhar is named in his honour.

Bhullar is married to Daljeet Kaur and has two sons. His eldest son, Harcharan Singh Bhullar, Police Medal (India) is serving as an Indian Police Service officer in the Punjab Police holding the rank of Senior Superintendent of Police and has been notable in the districts of Sangrur, Barnala, Fatehgarh Sahib, Hoshiarpur, Khanna, Jagraon, Gurdaspur and Mohali as SSP. Bhullar's youngest son, Kuldeep Singh Bhullar, is a former politician who was the Indian National Congress candidate for Zira in the Punjab Vidhan Sabha elections of 2002.

Bhullar is honorary lifetime president of the Punjab Volleyball Association.

References

Indian police officers
People from Punjab, India
1943 births
Living people